Antoine Arnauld (August 6, 1560, Paris – 29 December 1619, Paris) was a lawyer in the Parlement de Paris, and a Counsellor of State under Henry IV.

Life
Antoine Arnauld was the son of the general advocate of Catherine de' Medici. Raised a Protestant, he is thought to have converted to Catholicism after the St. Bartholomew's Day massacre. A skilled orator, his most famous speech was in 1594 in favor of the University of Paris and against the Jesuits, decrying their lack of support for Henry IV, newly converted from Protestantism to Catholicism. 
He wrote a number of political pamphlets which were widely distributed. The best known of his writings is entitled Le franc et véritable discours du Roi sur le rétablissement qui lui est demandé des Jésuites (1602). He was married to Catherine Marion de Druy, daughter of Simon Marion, baron de Druy, advocate general of Henry IV. They had twenty children, ten of whom survived him.

Notable descendants

Children
Robert Arnauld d'Andilly (1588–1674), courtier and author
Catherine Lemaistre (1590–1651)
Marie Angelique Arnauld (1591–1661), Abbess of Port Royal
Agnès Arnauld (1593–1672), Abbess of Port Royal
Gabrielle Arnauld
Henri Arnauld (1597–1692), bishop of Angers
Antoine Arnauld (1612–1694), theologian, philosopher and mathematician

Grandchildren
Antoine Le Maistre (1608–1658), lawyer, author and translator
Simon Arnauld de Pomponne (1618–1699), diplomat
Antoine Arnauld (1616-1698), memoirist 
Angélique de Saint-Jean Arnauld d'Andilly, nun

References

External links
Arnauld Catholic Encyclopedia

Arnauld, Antoine (lawyer)
Arnauld, Antoine (lawyer)
Conseil d'État (France)
Arnauld, Antoine (lawyer)
Arnauld, Antoine (lawyer)
French male essayists
17th-century French lawyers